Naeem Ahmed Kharal is a Pakistani politician who had been a Member of the Provincial Assembly of Sindh, from May 2013 to May 2018.

Early life and education
He was born on 19 January 1957 in Khairpur District.

He has a degree of Bachelor of Arts from Karachi University.

Political career

He was elected to the Provincial Assembly of Sindh as a candidate of Pakistan Peoples Party (PPP) from Constituency PS-34 KHAIRPUR-VI in 2013 Pakistani general election.

He was re-elected to Provincial Assembly of Sindh as a candidate of PPP from Constituency PS-31 (Khairpur-VI) in 2018 Pakistani general election.

References

Living people
Sindh MPAs 2013–2018
1957 births
Pakistan People's Party MPAs (Sindh)
Sindh MPAs 2018–2023